Malcolm Dunford (born 10 January 1963) is a former successful New Zealand association football player who frequently represented his country in the 1980s and 90s. A centre back, Dunford played with a number of central defenders including Bobby Almond, Ricki Herbert- stalwarts of New Zealand's successful 1982 World Cup campaign - and Ceri Evans.

Dunford captained his national team on numerous occasions and eventually retired his captaincy and national duties in 1993.
He finished his playing career for the All Whites with 62 appearances, 41 of which were A-internationals in which he scored 5 goals.

He currently lives in Australia, married with three children.

References

External links

1963 births
Living people
New Zealand association footballers
New Zealand international footballers
Stop Out players
Wellington United players
Miramar Rangers AFC players
Association football defenders